Javier García Paniagua (February 13, 1935 – November 25, 1998) was a Mexican politician who ran for the presidency of Mexico in 1981.

References

Politicians from Jalisco
1935 births
1998 deaths
Mexican Secretaries of the Agrarian Reform
Institutional Revolutionary Party politicians
20th-century Mexican politicians